Prime World: Defenders is a cross-platform collectible card Tower Defense game set in the Prime World universe. The game uses a Free-to-play distribution model.
In December 2012 Prime World: Defenders was announced and released for beta testing.
In June 2013, Prime World: Defenders was released on Steam.
In June 2014, Prime World: Defenders was released for Android, iOS, Facebook, NVIDIA Shield, Kongregate, and Android TV.
The player acts as the Ranger, the tactical and strategic commander of a small group of Defenders. The group performs raids in the deep Prime Zone, fighting Creeps and hunting artifacts. The player collects Magic and Tower cards to use later in battles with the monsters (the Creeps, also known as the Touched). The group is located on the Ballooneer, their mobile base.

Mechanics 
This game is a mix of classic Tower Defense mechanics with some collecting elements. At the beginning, the player is offered a starting set of Spell and Tower cards. As the game progresses the user gets new cards, which can later be improved in various ways.
There are three card types:
 Towers are used for building defenses in battles.
 Spells deal damage to monsters and/or weaken them.
 Enhancers are used to upgrade Tower and Spell cards.

Functionality 
 World Map where the game storyline unfolds in order.
 Collection is a game menu that shows all of the user's available cards. The Collection menu is also used to prepare for battle – the user, if necessary, can change the current Tower Booster and Spell Set to complete a specific World Map level.
 The Blacksmith is the card upgrade menu.
 Talents is the menu where the user can unlock Talents for in-game currency. Talents provide extra bonuses such as +5% Tower Damage.
 The Shop is the menu where the user can buy card sets or game currency.
 The Main Menu provides access to auxiliary features, such as:
1.	The Encyclopedia: descriptions of cards, enemies, and the game's main characters. The Encyclopedia can also refresh your memory of the game story.
2.	Leaderboards
3.	Achievements
4.	Settings

Main Characters 
 Ranger. The player's alter ego. A wanderer and adventurer in the past,  he is a new Defender at the start of the story. He is responsible for battle tactics and strategy.
 Audrey. A girl from the Dohkt faction. A mechanic and inventor. She is responsible for Tower construction and upgrades. The resident engineer.
 Imir. Founder of the Defenders. A mage and the best ancient artifact expert on the continent.
 Urd-Nag. A Creep hero. This Creep leader appears to be the main antagonist of the Defenders in the story.

Story 
In a time when Praia is engulfed in clashes between the Adornians and the Dohkts, the Defenders set off towards the depths of the Prime Zone in search of rare artifacts. During their quest for precious loot, on-board sensors detect an incredible outburst of magic power. The heroes decide they have detected an unbelievably strong artifact and set off to find it. When the heroes locate the artifact, it becomes clear that monsters (the Creeps) found it long ago and have been feeding on its energy ever since. The heroes decide to cut through the enemy hordes and seize the artifact. Once they succeed, they transport the artifact to the fortified castle they use as their base. However, the monsters are not so easily defeated, and they besiege they castle to recover their source of power. The battle brings the heroes face to face with Urd-Nag, a powerful monster hero and the Creeps' leader. The heroes stage the castle's defense, planning to load the artifact onto the Ballooneer and flee. The heroes manage to flee and avoid direct contact with the monsters' leader. As their old base no longer exists, they decide to find a new shelter. Ranger, with his vast Prime Zone wandering experience, tells the rest of the Defenders about a valley hidden between the cliffs. Upon their arrival at their new home, Imir starts to investigate the mysterious artifact and finds a way to unlock its full power and use it for the benefit of the group. The heroes need a Prime Booster and an ancient artifact, the Dragon Claw Sword. The heroes get the Prime Booster as a reward for saving a miners' dwelling from the Creeps' raids. While the Sword is traded for with artifact traders. Once the artifact is activated, it turns out that Imir has used the rest of the group for his own benefit: he leaves the Defenders, having gained incredible power and immortality. Audrey and Ranger are left with nothing and are besieged by Urd-Nag's monster hordes – the monsters sensed the energy outburst of the artifact and have come to reclaim their property. Now the heroes have their final battle ahead of them.

Distribution 
Prime World: Defenders was available as a part of the Prime World loader during limited beta-testing. In June 2013 the game was released on Steam and, until now, was a buy-to-play game. There are no microtransactions in the Steam version.
There is also a free-to-play version of the game available for download on the following platforms:
 iOS
 Android
 Facebook
 Windows Store
 Kongregate

References

External links 
 Official Website

Tower defense video games
Mobile games
Video games developed in Russia